Marvel Games is the publishing brand for video games based on Marvel properties, and is also the video game division of Marvel Entertainment. Before the incorporation of Marvel Games, video games based on Marvel properties released between 1982 and 1985 were handled by Marvel Comics Group, with Marvel video games from 1986 to 1998 being handled by Marvel Entertainment Group, whilst video games based on Marvel properties prior to the incorporation of Marvel Games were handled directly by Marvel Enterprises.

History 
Established in March 2009, the label handles the licensing of Marvel intellectual properties to video game developers and publishers. After The Walt Disney Company acquisition of Marvel Entertainment later that year, Marvel Games assets were integrated into Disney Interactive, whilst the division itself remained under Marvel Entertainment.

The Marvel Games branding was revived after Disney discontinued their interactive media business as a first party developer and publisher by shutting down Disney Interactive Studios, opting to license their intellectual properties for video games instead. Since then, Marvel Games has been involved with publishing and distribution of all Marvel related video games with third parties.

List of Marvel games

1980s

1990s

2000s

2010s

2020s

See also 
List of video games based on comics
List of video games based on DC Comics
List of video games featuring Spider-Man
List of video games featuring the Hulk
List of video games featuring the Punisher
List of video games featuring the X-Men
Marvel vs. Capcom
Spider-Man (Insomniac Games series)

References 

2009 establishments in California
American companies established in 2009
Windows games
Video games, Marvel
Marvel Comics
Marvel comics based games
 
Video games
Video game companies established in 2009
Companies based in Glendale, California
Video game companies based in California
.
Video game development companies
Video game publishers